Dylan Ryan Lee (born August 1, 1994) is an American professional baseball pitcher for the Atlanta Braves of Major League Baseball (MLB). He played college baseball for Fresno State. He was drafted by the Miami Marlins in the 10th round of the 2016 MLB draft. He made his MLB debut in 2021 and started the fourth game of the 2021 World Series for the Atlanta Braves.

Amateur career
Lee attended Dinuba High School in Dinuba, California. Undrafted out of high school, he attended the College of the Sequoias in Visalia, California for two years. Lee then transferred to Fresno State to play for the Bulldogs. He was drafted by the Miami Marlins in the 10th round of the 2016 MLB draft.

Professional career

Miami Marlins
Lee split his professional debut season of 2016 between the Gulf Coast Marlins and the Batavia Muckdogs; producing a combined 0–1 record with a 2.48 ERA and 13 strikeouts over 29 innings. He spent the 2017 season with the Greensboro Grasshoppers, going 4–10 with a 4.85 ERA and 73 strikeouts over  innings.

Lee split the 2018 season between the Jupiter Hammerheads, the Jacksonville Jumbo Shrimp, and the New Orleans Baby Cakes, going a combined 8–3 with a 1.60 ERA and 63 strikeouts over 62 innings. He split the 2019 season between Jacksonville and New Orleans, going 1–6 with 13 saves and a 2.91 ERA and 56 strikeouts over  innings. Lee did not play in 2020 due to the cancellation of the Minor League Baseball season because of the COVID-19 pandemic. Lee was released by Miami on March 29, 2021.

Atlanta Braves
Lee signed a minor league contract with the Atlanta Braves on April 15, 2021. He spent the 2021 minor league season with the Gwinnett Stripers, going 5–1 with one save and a 1.58 ERA and 52 strikeouts over  innings.

On September 22, 2021, Lee was added to the active roster and promoted to the major league for the first time. He pitched in relief against the New York Mets on October 1, yielding one hit and recording his first strikeout in his major league debut. On October 8, it was announced that Lee was among the Braves relievers to make the team’s postseason roster. Lee did not pitch in any games during the National League Division Series against the Milwaukee Brewers and he was initially left off the roster as the Braves advanced to the National League Championship Series against the Los Angeles Dodgers. However, when Huascar Ynoa suffered a shoulder injury, Lee was once again added to the roster. He remained with the team as they advanced to the World Series against the Houston Astros. On October 30, it was announced he would start Game 4 of the World Series against Zack Greinke. He is the first pitcher in MLB history to make a first major league start in a World Series game. Prior to his start in the 2021 World Series, he only had two regular season big league appearances, the fewest career appearances for a starting pitcher in World Series history. However, Lee was pulled after facing four batters, giving up two walks, one hit and one run while recording only one out.

Lee began the 2022 season with Triple A Gwinnett. He was promoted to the major league roster on April 19, 2022. The Braves optioned Lee back to Gwinnett on April 21. He returned to the major leagues on May 23 and remained there for the remainder of the 2022 season. Lee earned his first career victory on June 13. In 46 games, Lee had a 5-1 record and a 2.13 ERA.

References

External links

Fresno State Bulldogs bio

1994 births
Living people
People from Dinuba, California
Sportspeople from Tulare County, California
Baseball players from California
Major League Baseball pitchers
Atlanta Braves players
College of the Sequoias Giants baseball players
Fresno State Bulldogs baseball players
Gulf Coast Marlins players
Batavia Muckdogs players
Greensboro Grasshoppers players
Jupiter Hammerheads players
Jacksonville Jumbo Shrimp players
New Orleans Baby Cakes players
Gwinnett Stripers players